ROKS Dae Jo-yeong (DDH-977) is a  in the Republic of Korea Navy. She is named after Dae Jo-yeong.

Design 
The KDX-II is part of a much larger build up program aimed at turning the ROKN into a blue-water navy. It is said to be the first stealthy major combatant in the ROKN and was designed to significantly increase the ROKN's capabilities.

Construction and career 
ROKS Dae Jo-yeong was launched on 12 November 2003 by Daewoo Shipbuilding and commissioned on 30 June 2005.

RIMPAC 2018 
ROKS Dae Jo-yeong, ROKS Park Wi and ROKS Yulgok Yi I participated in RIMPAC 2018 which will last from 27 June to 2 August 2018.

Gallery

References 

Chungmugong Yi Sun-shin-class destroyers 
2003 ships 
Ships built by Daewoo Shipbuilding & Marine Engineering